Raquel Roxanne "Rocsi" Diaz also known as just Rocsi, is an Honduran-born television and radio personality and model. She is best known as the co-host on the BET  program 106 & Park from 2006–2012. She was a correspondent on Entertainment Tonight during 2012–2014, where she was billed as "Rocsi Diaz".

Early life
Diaz was born in Tegucigalpa, Honduras but moved with her family to New Orleans, Louisiana. She is of Honduran and Chilean descent. Rocsi announced on 106 & Park on July 30, 2009, that she suffered from anorexia during her years in middle school and high school due to her love for cheerleading. She graduated from West Jefferson High School in Harvey, Louisiana. She graduated from Nicholls State University.

Career
After growing up in New Orleans, she launched her career in Dallas, Texas, as a host on the city's premier urban radio station, 97.9 The Beat. Here, Rocsi cultivated a unique, street-smart style that caught the attention of Boston's Hot 97.7,  where she later became a DJ.  In 2004, she moved to Chicago where she was hired as midday-hour DJ at radio station  Power 92 WPWX-FM, and was known as "The Midday Mami".

Television
Diaz appeared on MTV's Fear as a contestant in 2000.

BET personalities AJ Calloway and Free left the network on July 28, 2005. They were replaced by Big Tigger and Julissa Bermudez. They left and Rocsi on July 6, 2006 won the role of co-host of BET's 106 & Park along with Terrence J. The show can be seen in over 85 million homes in U.S., United Kingdom, Canada, Africa, Caribbean, and Japan. For the debut in Japan, she and co-host Terrence J taped footage there, and appeared on MTV Video Music Awards Japan. 
In 2007, Rocsi starred as a BET News correspondent in Def Jam: Icon, but only appears in cutscenes on TV and not in fighting mode.

On 19 November 2012, Diaz joined Entertainment Tonight as a daily correspondent and weekend co-host.  In June 2014, Diaz was awarded a Daytime Emmy award as part of the cast for Outstanding Entertainment News Program. On 17 September 2014, Diaz was let go from the show as CNN's Nischelle Turner was hired.

In August 2013, she was recognised by the National Council of La Raza: Nuestro Pueblo. She received the Ruben Salazar Award for Communications.

On 23 January 2015, Diaz announced she had been hired by CNN's HLN.  She is the Los Angeles contributor to their show The Daily Share that airs from 12-5 PM EST.

In August 2015, she marked the ten year anniversary of Hurricane Katrina by returning home with cameras.  She showed how her childhood street was bare of homes.

Diaz serves as the host to the third season of Dating Naked on VH1 replacing the original two-seasoned host Amy Paffrath.

Diaz provided color commentary for Cannonball on the USA Network alongside Mike “The Miz” Mizanin, who called the play-by-play.

In 2021, she became the host of the new Fox reality singing competition Alter Ego.

Personal life
She has been a vegetarian since college and appeared in a PETA ad campaign promoting the diet.

Filmography

References

External links

Living people
People from Tegucigalpa
Honduran emigrants to the United States
West Jefferson High School (Louisiana) alumni
Nicholls State University alumni
American television hosts
American women television presenters
1981 births
American people of Chilean descent
American people of Honduran descent
People from New Orleans
American actresses of Honduran descent